Amsterdam tram line 26, popularly known as the IJtram, is a tram line operating between Amsterdam Centraal station and the IJburg district in Amsterdam, the Netherlands. , the IJtram was the busiest tram line in Amsterdam, carrying 30,000 riders per day. The  line has 11 stops and a scheduled end-to-end travel time of 22 minutes.

Infrastructure
From the eastern side of Stationsplein, the square in front of Amsterdam Centraal station, line 26 runs eastbound beside the streets De Ruijterkade and Piet Heinkade within the Eastern Docklands area. The line continues through a short tunnel under Piet Heinkade, to enter the Rietlandpark stop, which lies in an open pit requiring tram riders to use stairs or lifts to go between the street and platform levels. Eastbound from Rietlandpark, trams pass through the  Piet Hein Tunnel to surface on Zeeburgereiland (NL:eiland = EN:island) where there is a tram storage yard. Proceeding further east, the tram line crosses the Enneüs Heerma Bridge onto Steigereiland and then crosses another bridge (Brug 2002) onto Haveneiland to terminate at the IJburg stop.

The IJtram runs in a right-of-way separated from road traffic except for level crossings at cross-streets and some mixed traffic at the line's two terminal loops at Amsterdam Centraal station and at the IJburg stop. The only rail connection between the IJtram and the rest of the tram system is at Centraal station; because of this, diversions to other tram lines are not possible in the event of a disruption along the line.

Coupled trams have a crew of two, a driver on the first tram and a conductor on the second. Both sell tickets, but the GVB encourages passengers without tickets to board the second tram. Trams on the line can be scheduled to run as frequently as every 4 minutes.

In the event of an emergency, this restriction gives emergency workers easier access to the site. Trams require 3 minutes to ride through the tunnel, and trams must enter and leave the tunnel on schedule to avoid a bottleneck at the tunnel entrance. All trams using the tunnel must be equipped with ATB, a Dutch implementation of Automatic Train Control.

Centraal station has two stops for the IJtram. The regular stop is on the eastern half of Stationsplein on the south side of the station. An "emergency" stop (noodhalte) is located on the east or "IJ" side (IJzijde) of the station, which is used only when the regular stop is not available due to special events or construction projects.

The IJtram has its own tram storage yard (IJtramstalling) on Zeeburgereiland near the Bob Haarmslaan tram stop. It can store up to 32 trams and handle the coupled pairs of trams used on the line. The yard has a carwash and a sand filling station for trams. Major tram maintenance must be done elsewhere. Every 12 weeks, each tram must be sent to the Havenstraat depot for maintenance, and every 24 weeks to the GVB workshops in Diemen to grind flat wheels round.

History
On 31 May 2005, the IJtram opened, operating as tram line 26. Trams operated every 10 minutes in rush hours and every 15 minutes in the off-hours. A park and ride facility (P+R Zeeburg) also opened which, along with local residents along the line, provided ridership for the new line. Also, the IJtram storage yard (IJburgstalling) had opened on Zeeburgereiland to store up to 18 trams.

On 8 December 2017, line 26 became the first tram line in Amsterdam to stop accepting cash for fare payment on board the tram. Payment could still be made via OV-chipkaart or by a credit or debit card having a personal identification number. Because of the tunnel and the line's stand-alone status, the GVB considered line 26 to be ideal for the introduction of cashless payment on trams. GVB busses had been cashless since March 2017.

Starting July 2018, the line was running up to 15 trams per hour during the morning and afternoon rush hours.

In October 2019, an alternative turning circle for the IJtram was completed on the IJ side of Centraal Station for use when events such as Koningsdag or Gay Pride block the regular stop on Stationsplein. Work on the loop had started in March 2008, and was completed in time for track replacement on Stationsplein in 2020. The cost to construct the loop was 7 million euros.

On 28 September 2020, the GVB started operating coupled pairs of trams on the IJtram. Test running of coupled pairs had started in 2017. Due to growth in the number of residents in the IJburg area plus riders from the park-and-ride facility on Zeeburgereiland, the line had reached its capacity using single trams. Coupled trams doubled that capacity. Implementing coupled trams during the COVID-19 pandemic, which reduced ridership, the GVB operated nine coupled pairs with a tenth pair held in reserve.

Also on 28 September 2020, the IJtram storage yard (IJburgstalling), reopened after a renovation to increase its capacity to 32 trams and to handle coupled pairs of trams.

Proposed expansion
By 2018, there were proposals, costing at least 330 million euros, to expand tram service to IJburg to handle traffic from 8,000 planned new residences. In one proposal, the IJtram would be extended to Centrumeiland and Strandeiland to be completed in two phases in 2023 and 2028. Another proposal was to establish a tram connection south from Zeeburgereiland over a new bridge near the existing  (Amsterdam Bridge) which was not strong or wide enough for a new tram line. Instead of a new tram line, bus service was also being considered.

, the GVB said the proposed extension between Centrumeiland and Strandeiland would require the purchase of 13 additional trams.

Gallery

See also
 Amsteltram: Amsterdam tram line 25 also uses coupled pairs of trams on a right-of-way separated from road traffic.

References

Rail transport in Amsterdam
Tram transport in the Netherlands
Trams in Amsterdam